Damien Pottinger (born January 17, 1982) is a Canadian former professional soccer player who played as a forward.

Career

College career 
Pottinger began playing at the college level with Duquesne University in 2000, where he is currently the University's all-time leading goal-scorer with 34 goals. After a successful stint with Duquesne, he was named to the Atlantic 10 Pre-Season All-Conference Team and the Most Valuable Offensive Player. His achievements were recognized in 2009 when he was inducted into the university's hall of fame.

Club career 
He played in the Canadian Professional Soccer League  during the college offseason with Vaughan Sun Devils making his debut on June 21, 2002, against the Ottawa Wizards where he registered a goal in a 3–1 victory. After the conclusion of his college career, he was selected second overall by Edmonton Aviators in the 2004 A-League draft. Instead, he would sign a contract with Pittsburgh Riverhounds in the USL Pro Soccer League where he appeared in eight matches and recorded a goal. He returned to Pittsburgh for the 2005 season where he appeared in 14 matches and recorded three goals.

In 2006, he was acquired by the Toronto Lynx of the USL First Division. He made his debut on June 4, 2006, against Virginia Beach Mariners which ended in a scoreless draw. On June 15 he recorded his first goal with Toronto against Miami FC in a 2–2 draw. In his debut season, he scored 5 goals in 21 games. He participated in the 2006 Open Canada Cup final where Toronto was defeated by Ottawa St. Anthony Italia. 

In 2009, he appeared in a semifinal match in the Canadian Soccer League with Italia Shooters against Trois-Rivières Attak, where he recorded a goal. In 2014, he played in the Ontario Soccer League with GS United where he finished as the top goal scorer in the Provincial Elite division.

Indoor career 
In the winter of 2004, he played in the Major Indoor Soccer League with Philadelphia KiXX. In his debut season with Philadelphia, he assisted the club in securing a  playoff berth. He re-signed with Philadelphia for the 2005-2006 season. Midway through 2006 he played with league rivals St. Louis Steamers in 2006. During the 2007-08 indoor season he played with the Orlando Sharks.

Honors 
GS United

 Ontario Soccer League Provincial Elite Top goal scorer (1): 2014

References

External links
 Player Bio: Damien Pottinger - DUQUESNE OFFICIAL ATHLETIC SITE
 Fanbase Profile
 Homepage Bio
 Twitter

1982 births
Black Canadian soccer players
Canadian expatriate sportspeople in the United States
Canadian expatriate soccer players
Canadian soccer players
Duquesne Dukes men's soccer players
Duquesne University alumni
Association football forwards
Living people
Major Indoor Soccer League (2001–2008) players
Philadelphia KiXX (2001–2008 MISL) players
St. Louis Steamers (2003–2006 MISL) players
Orlando Sharks players
Soccer players from Toronto
Sportspeople from Scarborough, Toronto
Pittsburgh Riverhounds SC players
Toronto Lynx players
USL First Division players
USL Second Division players
York Region Shooters players
Canadian Soccer League (1998–present) players